Darius Kasparaitis (born October 16, 1972) is a Lithuanian-American former professional ice hockey defenceman. He mainly played in the National Hockey League (NHL) for the New York Islanders, Pittsburgh Penguins, Colorado Avalanche, and New York Rangers. He is a four-time Olympian and three-time medalist, winning one gold medal, one silver medal, and one bronze medal. He received the title of Honoured Master of Sports of the USSR in 1992 and was inducted into the Russian and Soviet Hockey Hall of Fame in 2016. His 28 career Olympic games is a record among Russian national team's players.

Playing career
Kasparaitis left Lithuania for Russia at age 14 after training with Aleksey Nikiforov to play ice hockey at a higher level. Kasparaitis played his first game for Dynamo Moscow, one of the premier teams in the Soviet Union, at the age of 16 during the 1988–89 season, and won the Soviet League championship with them in 1992. He was drafted by the New York Islanders with the fifth overall pick in the first round of the 1992 NHL Entry Draft. Kasparaitis played for the New York Islanders, Pittsburgh Penguins, Colorado Avalanche, and New York Rangers.

Kasparaitis was known for his aggressive physical playing style and led his teams in hits several times, including his rookie season, in 1992–93 NHL season with the New York Islanders. On November 17, 1996, Kasparaitis was traded to the Pittsburgh Penguins. While playing for the Pittsburgh Penguins in 1998 Kasparaitis made a hard hit on Eric Lindros that knocked Lindros out of action for 18 games. On March 19, 2002, he was traded to the Colorado Avalanche at the trade deadline, where he spent the remainder of the 2001–02 NHL season. Kasparaitis eventually wound up with the New York Rangers when he was signed on July 2, 2002. During the 2005–06 season, he served as an alternate captain of the Rangers, along with Jaromír Jágr and Steve Rucchin, as the Rangers had no captain.

Because the Lithuanian national ice hockey team was relatively weak and had not ever played in major competitions, Kasparaitis chose to represent Russia in official events. In December 2005, Kasparaitis was chosen to represent Russia in the 2006 Winter Olympics. At the start of the 2006–07 season, Kasparaitis was replaced as an alternate captain with the Rangers by newly acquired Brendan Shanahan. He was waived by the New York Rangers on January 24, 2007 and subsequently demoted to the Rangers' affiliate in Hartford.

Kasparaitis was once again waived by the Rangers prior to the 2007–08 season. On November 3, 2007, the Rangers announced that Kasparaitis had been loaned to SKA St. Petersburg of the then-Russian Superleague (RSL), now the KHL. The deal was made possible due to a lack of a transfer agreement between Russia and North America at the time. However, the Rangers retained his NHL rights.

Kasparaitis left an enduring impression with Ranger fans with the team salute that he created. After every Rangers home win, Kasparaitis would direct the players to center ice and have the whole team follow in saluting the fans by raising their sticks in the air before departing the ice. The tradition is still carried on by the Rangers for every home win. He continued to play for SKA Saint Petersburg in the 2008–09 season. In 26 games, he contributed a single assist.

In the 2009–10 season, he did not play due to an injury and eventually announced his retirement at the conclusion of the season. Since his retirement he has attempted to become eligible to represent Lithuania internationally, which he finally did in 2018, playing for the team in the World Ice Hockey Championships Division 1B.

Playing style

Kasparaitis played the game in the mold of a hard-hitting stay-at-home defenceman, a playing style which in Kasparaitis's case also included a substantial amount of agitation. In his rookie season in the NHL in 1992–93, he had already earned a reputation as a pesky player; one hockey pundit at the time wrote that he "shows an unusual lack of respect and deference for established NHL stars." One such star was Pittsburgh Penguins captain Mario Lemieux; in Game 6 of the Patrick Division finals during the 1993 Stanley Cup playoffs, Kasparaitis was "in Lemieux's face" for much of the game, at one point giving him a glove to the face and eventually earning a 2-minute elbowing penalty.

During the 1997–98 season, while a member of the Pittsburgh Penguins, Kasparaitis decked Philadelphia Flyers captain Eric Lindros along the boards with a hard and straight hit to the chest, a hit which left Lindros with a concussion and held him out of the game for over a month. The two players later became teammates and friends when Kasparaitis signed with the New York Rangers for the 2002–03 season, with Lindros himself helping to pitch Rangers as the right destination for Kasparaitis by calling him at midnight on July 1, 2002.

During the 2005–06 NHL season, while playing for the New York Rangers, Kasparaitis had run-ins with New Jersey Devils right winger Grant Marshall, with Kasparaitis delivering a shoulder to the head of Marshall which concussed the New Jersey winger on January 22, and Marshall retaliating on March 4 by sucker-punching Kasparaitis in the head. Marshall stated he had "zero respect" for Kasparaitis. Kasparaitis on the other hand said he was in complete control of his emotions, and that he would not allow his game to become a distraction to his own team.

Post-retirement
On June 19, 2010, Kasparaitis signed as the assistant coach for SKA Saint Petersburg of the Kontinental Hockey League (KHL). The contract expired on December 22, 2010.

In early 2015, Kasparaitis co-founded the Verzasca Group, a Florida-based real estate development company, of which he holds the title as president. The company is named after the Verzasca river in Switzerland, because of the "transparency that the firm strives to bring to both its investors and its development partners." Later in the year, the company had gained approval on two residential projects in the Miami area.

Personal life
Kasparaitis holds dual Lithuanian and United States citizenship. He is the father of six children. He has a daughter by his first wife, Irina. His second marriage, to Ingela ended in divorce in 2006. Kasparaitis's current wife, Lisa, is a Swedish designer based in Stockholm and Miami. From 2009 to 2011, he lived in Sweden. They have twin daughters, who were born in Sweden, and three sons.

Career statistics

Regular season and playoffs

International

Awards and honors
 1990: European Junior Championship All-Star Team
 1992: World Junior Championships Best Defenseman
 1992: Honoured Master of Sports of the USSR (renamed Honoured Master of Sports of Russia in 1993)
 2016: Russian Hockey Hall of Fame

References

External links
 

1972 births
Living people
Ak Bars Kazan players
Colorado Avalanche players
Expatriate ice hockey players in the United States
Hartford Wolf Pack players
HC Dynamo Moscow players
Ice hockey players at the 1992 Winter Olympics
Ice hockey players at the 1998 Winter Olympics
Ice hockey players at the 2002 Winter Olympics
Ice hockey players at the 2006 Winter Olympics
Lithuanian emigrants to the United States
Lithuanian expatriate ice hockey people
Lithuanian expatriate sportspeople in the United States
Lithuanian ice hockey defencemen
Medalists at the 1992 Winter Olympics
Medalists at the 1998 Winter Olympics
Medalists at the 2002 Winter Olympics
National Hockey League first-round draft picks
New York Islanders draft picks
New York Islanders players
New York Rangers players
Olympic bronze medalists for Russia
Olympic gold medalists for the Unified Team
Olympic ice hockey players of Russia
Olympic ice hockey players of the Unified Team
Olympic medalists in ice hockey
Olympic silver medalists for Russia
People from Elektrėnai
People with acquired American citizenship
Pittsburgh Penguins players
SKA Saint Petersburg players
Soviet ice hockey defencemen